The brown-backed ctenotus (Ctenotus coggeri), also known commonly as Cogger's ctenotus,  is a species of skink, a lizard in the family Scincidae. The species is endemic to the Northern Territory in Australia.

Etymology
The specific name, coggeri, is in honor of Australian herpetologist Harold Cogger.

Habitat
The preferred natural habitat of C. coggeri is forest.

Description
C. coggeri is heavy-bodied and large for its genus.

Reproduction
C. coggeri is oviparous.

References

Further reading
Cogger HG (2014). Reptiles and Amphibians of Australia, Seventh Edition. Clayton, Victoria, Australia: CSIRO Publishing. xxx + 1,033 pp. .
Sadlier RA (1985). "A New Australian scincid lizard, Ctenotus coggeri, from the Alligator Rivers Region, Northern Territory". Records of the Australian Museum 36 (3): 153–156.
Wilson S, Swan G (2013). A Complete Guide to Reptiles of Australia, Fourth Edition. Sydney: New Holland Publishers. 522 pp. .

coggeri
Reptiles described in 1985
Taxa named by Ross Allen Sadlier